Zamora is a province of western Spain, in the western part of the autonomous community of Castile and León. It is bordered by the provinces of Ourense, León, Valladolid, and Salamanca, and by Portugal.

The present-day province of Zamora was one of three provinces formed from the former Kingdom of León in 1833, when Spain was reorganized into 49 provinces. Of the 174,549 people (2018) in the province, nearly a third live in the capital, Zamora. This province has 250 municipalities.

Geography

The Province of Zamora is in northwestern Spain where it borders on Portugal, which lies to the southwest. To the west lies the province of Ourense, to the north lies León, to the east lies Valladolid, and to the south lies Salamanca. The River Esla rises in the Cantabrian Mountains in the north and flows southwards through the province before joining the River Douro (Spanish: el Duero) which then forms part of the boundary with Portugal. The Esla is the largest tributary of the Duero and where they join, discharges a greater quantity of water than that discharged by the Duero. The capital of the province is Zamora which is situated in the south of the province on the banks of the Duero.

Its economy is largely agricultural and it has a tradition of sheep rearing, producing a large proportion of Spain's merino wool.

Population
The historical population is given in the following chart:

History
A megalithic culture developed in this region of Spain, particularly around Aliste, and there are many remaining signs of the presence of various cultures over the years. Salt mining took place at Villafáfila, stone forts were built on fertile plains and near rivers, and others were built in the vicinity of mines where variscite and iron ore were extracted. Rock paintings have been discovered and artefacts found include everyday pottery, tools, and gold and silver jewellery. In the Iron Age, Celtic tribes built forts surrounded by moats but they were pastoral people, living in small villages, and did not build cities. They left standing stones and dolmens.

The Romans first came to Spain in 218 BC, and over the next three centuries there were various conflicts as the Romans advanced into Celtic lands. The Romans built roads across the territory and in 1978 the Roman town of Requejo in Santa Cristina de la Polvorosa was revealed after erosion occurred following flooding of the area by the River Órbigo. In 197 BC, Spain was divided into two provinces, Hispania Citerior and Hispania Ulterior, controlled by two separate Roman military forces. Zamora was in the latter region. Peace reigned until 155 BC when the Lusitanians attacked Hispania Ulterior. Two Roman defeats followed, and many other rebellions were sparked in the peninsula. The Romans eventually prevailed, and in 27 BC, subdivided the province of Hispania Ulterior into Hispania Baetica (modern-day Andalusia) and Lusitania, which included Zamora. When the Vandals invaded the province in the 5th century AD, the Roman Emperor Honorius sent his brother-in-law, the Visigoths' king, to defeat the Vandals. The Visigoths seized control of most of Hispania and made Toledo the capital, while the Suevi occupied the northwestern part of the Peninsula and made their capital city Bracara. By 585 the Suevi had been conquered by the Visigoths who then controlled the whole peninsula.

Tourism
Zamora has many fine historic churches and buildings. These include a twelfth century Romanesque cathedral, many other churches, city walls, ancient houses and a castle. Pottery, textiles and wine are manufactured here.

 further north lies Benavente. It is famous for its Santa María church and the Castle of La Mota (now the Parador of Benavente). The Parador was the home of Ferdinand II of León who died here while returning from a pilgrimage to Santiago de Compostela. The Parador occupies the Caracol Tower, a sixteenth-century castle, part of the former walled enclosure of the town.

The ancient town of Toro lies beside the Duero  to the east of Zamora. Ferdinand III of Castile was crowned King of León in the town in 1230 and his wife Elisabeth of Swabia (Beatriz) died here. Notable features include the façade of the 'Palacio de las Leyes' and also the Santa María la Mayor collegiate church (known in Spanish as La Colegiata). Legend has it that the wines of Toro were the first to reach America, being taken there by Christopher Columbus.

The town of Sanabria (or Senabria) is in the northeast of the province near the Sanabria Lake, one of the few large natural lakes in Spain, on the border with Galicia. It has been declared a Historic and Artistic centre. The lake is now part of Sanabria Lake Natural Park, having been declared a Natural Park in 1978.

Fermoselle is a medieval village located on the border with Portugal and on the edge of the Arribes del Duero Natural Park. Arribes is the name for the gorges through which the Duero and other rivers in this region flow. The steep slopes have long been terraced for the production of grapes, olives and other fruit.

Near the municipality of Villafáfila are lagoons that now form part of a nature reserve. They were formed by the historic mining of salt which started in the copper age and Bronze Age. Pottery items found here are similar to artefacts found in Mesopotamia, Turkey, Bosnia, Romania and Poland. The lagoons are home to numerous species of birds, and this is the second largest wetland reserve in Spain after Doñana National Park.

See also
 List of municipalities in Zamora
 Kingdom of León

References

External links

 Official website